Neomedina is a genus of parasitic flies in the family Tachinidae.

Species
Neomedina atripennis Malloch, 1935

Distribution
Samoa.

References

Monotypic Brachycera genera
Diptera of Australasia
Endemic fauna of Samoa
Exoristinae
Tachinidae genera
Taxa named by John Russell Malloch